Faithful Place is a 2010 crime novel by Tana French. The book is set in Dublin, featuring undercover detective Frank Mackey, who was a supporting character in French's previous novel, The Likeness. It is the third installment of French's loosely related "Dublin Murder Squad" series. Each follows a case in the heart of Ireland, with overlapping, complex characters that get involved in cases tied to their pasts.

Plot
When 19-year-old Frank Mackey was left waiting outside of an abandoned house one fateful night, he believed that his lover backed out on their plans of elopement. After finding a note inside the home, the teenager was convinced that Rosie Daly must have changed her mind. Determined to escape his dysfunctional family and the prison that was Faithful Place, he left regardless, albeit brokenhearted.

The plot picks up when, two decades later, Frank receives startling news. The now middle-aged detective is picking up his daughter Holly when his sister calls him with no warning. A suitcase was found behind the fireplace inside the abandoned house. Inside was girl's clothing, a birth certificate, and ferry tickets to England, the tickets Rosie and Frank had planned to use to leave their families two decades before. Frank is forced to return home after he left and never looked back. The story follows his discoveries as he revisits the past he left behind and discovers what really happened to Rosie Daly.

As soon as he sees the suitcase, he recognizes the jeans his once-lover wore and the tickets they had saved so diligently to afford. Later, he explores the basement and finds a piece of concrete out of place. The police on the case arrive, and sure enough, a young woman's body is found beneath the floor. Frank knows who it is immediately, but cannot get involved in the case. Although he is a police officer, his personal involvement and connections to the confining town mean that he has to step aside. The determined protagonist cannot do so, however, and pries until he finds out that his older brother, Shay, was the one that ended Rosie's life. Shay confesses inadvertently to Frank's daughter, Holly, that he killed Rosie when he found out Frank was leaving Faithful Place for good. Shay wanted to get out just as desperately but couldn't leave their younger siblings with their abusive father. He believed it was Frank's duty to stay, and murdered Rosie out of anger when he discovered their plans.

Characters
Frank Mackey – Protagonist and detective determined to find out what happened to his childhood sweetheart, Rosie Daly
Rosie Daly – Young woman murdered to be kept from running off and eloping with Frank Mackey
Holly Mackey – Frank Mackey's 9-year-old daughter; inadvertently finds out the truth about Rosie Daly
Seamus "Shay" Mackey – Frank Mackey's older brother; has anger issues and is unsuccessful because of his ties to his bitter, alcoholic parents
Kevin Mackey – Frank Mackey's younger brother

Style
Maureen Corrigan of The Washington Post stated that "the voice is what grabs you first" and continues on to say that "[the main character]'s voice is so wry, bitter and just plain alive".

Reception
Regina Marler of the Los Angeles Times described the book as "not a page-turner but a page-lingerer" and that "French gives us a clear-eyed portrait of the Liberties as seen through a murder." Janet Maslin of The New York Times remarked that "the first thing that Ms. French does so well in “Faithful Place” is to inhabit fully a scrappy, shrewd, privately heartbroken middle-aged man. The second is to capture the Mackey family’s long-brewing resentments in a way that’s utterly realistic on many levels. Sibling rivalries, class conflicts, old grudges, adolescent flirtations and memories of childhood violence are all deftly embedded in this novel, as is the richly idiomatic Dublinese." The Washington Post described the book as "breathtaking...devastating." Finally, Kirkus Reviews remarked that "the charming narrative will leave readers begging for a sequel."

Awards and nominations
Nominated for the International Dublin Literary Award, 2012
Nominated for the Edgar Award, Best Novel, 2011 
Finalist for the Irish Book Awards, Best Mystery Novel, 2010

References

External links
 Official website – US version, UK version
 

2010 Irish novels
Irish crime novels
Novels set in Dublin (city)
Works by Tana French